ASTRA Arad, also known as Întreprinderea de Vagoane Arad (IVA), is the name of a group of industrial engineering and rolling stock companies originated in Arad, Romania. Operating as a single entity until 1996, the company then split into other independent companies, Astra Vagoane for freight cars production (integrated later in Astra Rail Industries), Astra Vagoane Călători for passenger coaches and trams, and Astra Bus for bus and trolleybus manufacturing.

History

Early history

Johann Weitzer’sche Maschinen-Waggonfabrik
Johann Weitzer (born in 1832, died in 1902) was an Austrian skilled blacksmith and businessman. In 1854, he founded his own workshop, which expanded quickly, even producing vehicles for the construction of the Suez Canal. The main products were railway wagons and arms for Austrian use. In 1872, he transformed his enterprise into a joint-stock company, which later merged with two other companies to Simmering-Graz-Pauker. 

In 1891, Johann Weitzer founded, as a subsidiary of the Austrian company in the Hungarian part of Austria-Hungary, the John Weitzer Engine- & Waggon-building & Iron Casting Joint-stock Company. It produced locomotives, railway waggons, tramcars (such as 17 items for Temesvár (today Timișoara)), and, since 1903, Weitzer railmotor, Europe's first successful series of railcars.

MARTA
The automobiles manufactured in Arad was a licensed production of Westinghouse 150 cars from 1909 to 1912. In 1912 the plant was taken over by Austro-Daimler and renamed to MARTA, the acronym for Hungarian Automobile Joint-stock Company Arad (Hungarian: Magyar Automobil Részvény Társaság Arad). After the edition auf 500 automobiles, civil production ceased in 1914, due to World War I.

ASTRA Arad

In 1921, after the dissolution of the Austria-Hungary and the Treaty of Trianon, the two companies, located in Romania, merged to form ASTRA Automobile & Waggon Factory (Romanian: Fabrica de automobile și vagoane Astra). This company from 1922 to 1926 also manufactured some automobiles and lorries, but the main production were rail vehicles.

Întreprinderea de Vagoane Arad (IVA)
After World War II, the company was nationalized and became Europe's biggest manufacturer of freight cars, as Întreprinderea de Vagoane Arad (IVA). The factory also produced passenger coaches and ensured the entire fleet of coaches for Bucharest Metro. It produced railcars for internal market and exported to all five continents.

In 1990, the company was renamed as ASTRA Vagoane Arad. With privatization, in 1998-2000, it was split into specialists for the various branches. The production of freight cars, Astra Vagoane Arad, was sold to Trinity Industries, which sold it to International Railway Systems (IRS), seated in Luxemburg, but mainly based on plants in eastern Europe. In November 2010, Astra Vagoane Arad and the two other Romanian subsidiaries of IRS went bankrupt, and reformed under the name Astra Rail Industries (ARI) in 2012. In 2016, The Greenbrier Companies and ARI agreed to form a joint venture, 75% owned by Greenbrier. The new business is to be named Greenbrier-Astra Rail.

References

External links

 Astra Vagoane Călători
 Astra Rail Industries
 Astra Bus
 cimec.ro, Primele automobile române fabricate în România (in Romanian)
 kmarket.ro, Astra Vagoane Arad (in Romanian)

Arad, Romania
Companies established in 1891
Motor vehicle manufacturers of Austria-Hungary
Rolling stock manufacturers of Romania
Tram manufacturers
Privatized companies in Romania
Companies of Arad County

de:Astra Vagoane Călători#Fabrica de automobile și vagoane Astra